The American University of Malta (AUM) is a private, American-style liberal arts college in Cospicua, Malta. It is a co-educational institution and its launch was announced in May 2015. The project was intended to regenerate the South of Malta and give said area an economic and social boost. Since the proposal was announced, Dock 1 in Cospicua was chosen for the head campus, while extensions are being planned for other sites in Cospicua and Żonqor, Marsaskala. It was officially established on 16 September 2016.

The AUM welcomed their first small cohort of students in September 2017 while their main campus underwent major restoration. Once the restoration process of the main campus was finalized in January 2019, the AUM had their official inauguration ceremony in March of that same year.

History

On 5 May 2015, the Jordanian entrepreneur Hani Salah and the Government of Malta signed an agreement at Auberge de Castille for the former to set up a private educational institution called the American University of Malta (AUM). Initially the university was planned to be located in Spain, but the owner of Sadeen, Hani Salah, was persuaded to establish it in Malta by the then-Prime Minister of Malta, Joseph Muscat.

The National Commission for Further and Higher Education (NCFHE) officially accredited the AUM on 30 June 2016, after a 14-month process which included financial and academic evaluations. DePaul University provided the original curricula of the AUM.

In January 2016, John Ryder was named as the head of the American University of Malta, assuming the dual roles of Provost and Acting Vice President of the AUM. Ryder's qualifications for the post included a terminal academic degree in Philosophy and two-years' experience as president of Khazar University in Azerbaijan.

The university was supposed to accommodate 4000 students, primarily from the Middle East, North Africa and Europe. However, the university has consistently failed to meet its recruitment goals. By the time all campuses are complete, it is hope the university will have schools of business, architecture and design, engineering, arts, sciences, and information technology, each offering one or more Bachelor Degree Programs.

The original curricula of the AUM were provided by the DePaul University. The latter claims that it did not commit financial or human resources to the AUM, and it was not involved in any discussions with the Government of Malta. However, a member of DePaul's executive administrative team, Khaled El Zayyat, became the AUM's first Vice President of Global Initiatives: "El Zayyat previously held teaching and administrative posts at DePaul University, Chicago, and supervised dual degree graduate programmes for DePaul University in Jordan." El Zayyat initially hired and supervised IT staff at the AUM. Two months after the IT Administrator who reported to El Zayyat, David Aquilina, was dismissed, the Maltese government hired the same individual to work in an identical capacity in the Office of the Prime Minister.

The university was originally intended to create a social and economic boost to localities in the South Eastern Region of Malta, which is regarded as being less developed than the rest of the island. The project has an investment of over €115 million, and it was intended to create around 400 to 750 jobs. The project's estimated economic output was speculated to be about €48 to €85 million. As of September 2016, demand for property in Cospicua reportedly increased as a result of the university project. Also, concerns have arisen that the university's presence threatens the heritage and quality of life in the Bormla community and Three Cities region.
  
The university originally planned to take in its first students in October 2016, with lectures at SmartCity Malta until the head campus was completed. The beginning of the first academic year was later moved to 28 August 2017, with lectures held at the Dock No. 1 campus in Cospicua.

Accreditation and licensing

In December 2015, Leader of the Opposition Simon Busuttil stated that since the AUM applied for the licence of a "Higher Education Institution", its marketing of itself as a "University" is illegal. In January 2016, the National Commission for Further and Higher Education announced that Sadeen Education Investment Ltd had been given a licence to operate a Higher Education Institution under the name American Institute of Malta. This was the first step in the process to acquire a university licence. The commission has stated that a degree issued by the American Institute would have the same value as one issued by the University of Malta.

However, on 11 March 2016, Sadeen Education Investment Ltd was notified by a judicial letter that licensed higher education institutions are prohibited from using the word "university" in their advertising and publicity, unless they have been granted that status formally. On 6 May 2016, Economy Minister Chris Cardona said that he had "no doubt that this will be a University and not an institute. This is part of a process, but the project will result in a University".

The National Commission for Further and Higher Education (NCFHE) officially accredited the AUM on 30 June 2016, after a 14-month process which included financial and academic evaluations. The commission imposed a number of conditions on the AUM, including an annual audit by the Clemson University. Sadeen asked for a compromise on these conditions, but the commission insisted that they were not negotiable. After the conditions were accepted, the commission issued a 5-year university licence on 16 September 2016.

Two former employees of the National Commission for Further and Higher Education, both directly involved in the accreditation of the AUM, were hired by the university as lecturers in August 2019. One of the two former NCFHE employees hired by the AUM visited the campus for an inspection soon after the mass firing of faculty in January 2018. This episode became known as the accreditation-for-jobs scandal. Despite suspicions of ethical impropriety, an inquiry was never conducted.

Troubled tenure of founding provost
In July 2019, Provost John Ryder announced his resignation, stating that he had fulfilled his contract with the AUM but would have "loved not to have had some of the problems or [made some of the] mistakes" he did. These mistakes included hiring too many faculty members for the 2017-18 academic year, firing those same faculty en masse in January 2018, consistently hiding student enrolment figures to avoid media scrutiny and enacting poor quality assurance processes, resulting in the hiring of faculty who were guilty of academic plagiarism and degree fraud. Ryder was promptly replaced by another American higher education administrator, Jeremy Brown.

Ryder's decision to hire too many faculty before the first academic term and fire them without cause at the start of the second term damaged the institution's international reputation and complicated efforts to make cooperative agreements with other universities, even after his departure. Arkansas State University reconsidered its earlier decision to collaborate with the AUM on dual degree programs after uncovering former employees' negative comments on the site Glassdoor describing the mass termination event. In an interview with investigative journalist Lizzie Eldridge, Ryder confessed that although he was not among the faculty fired in January 2018, it was still the "worst day of my professional life by far."

Campuses
As of 2020, the American University of Malta is housed in a renovated building at Dock no. 1 in Cospicua. There are plans to extend the campus into nearby buildings in Cospicua, while a second campus at Żonqor Point in Marsaskala has also been proposed. The latter was originally intended to be the university's primary location, but on 20 August 2015 it was announced that the Maltese government and Sadeen Group had agreed to split the university campus between the two sites.

The government is lending out the land at Cospicua and Żonqor to Sadeen Group for around €200,000 a year. The government approved the granting of land for the AUM after a 15-hour long debate in parliament on 15 December 2015.

Cospicua campus

British Building (Sadeen Building)

The British Building was built between 1841 and 1844 as a workshop within Dock no. 1, which was being constructed for the British Royal Navy. Its architect was William Scamp, who also designed the rest of the dockyard, and some alterations were carried out in the late 19th and early 20th centuries. The building was damaged by aerial bombardment during World War II, and repairs and alterations made after the war were unsympathetic to the building's aesthetics. An almost identical building which was located on the opposite side of the dry dock was demolished between 1972 and 1974. This is regarded as destruction of cultural heritage, but it led to the creation of an open space which was rehabilitated and opened to the public in 2014.

The Planning Authority approved the restoration of the building to house part of the AUM campus on 25 August 2016. The renovation was carried out by Edwin Mintoff Architects between November 2016 and March 2019, and the project included conservation of the existing building, reconstruction of the parts which were destroyed during the war as well as the construction of an intermediate level and additional floors with a contemporary glass-and-steel design. The conversion of the building won the Golden A' Design Award in February 2020. The building is now known as the Sadeen Building, and it houses the university's lecture halls, laboratories, administrative facilities and library.

Knights' Building and proposed extensions

The Knights' Building was commissioned by Adrien de Wignacourt, Grand Master of the Order of St John, in 1689. In 1776, arcades were built over the existing building by Grand Master Emmanuel de Rohan-Polduc. When Malta was under British rule, the building's upper level was used as a sail loft and ropery. It was also damaged during World War II and it remained in a dilapidated state. Plans to restore the Knights' Building to house part of the AUM were announced in 2016, and the renovation was originally planned to be complete by 2017–18.

The project, which was also entrusted to Edwin Mintoff Architects, was to include alterations to the Knights' Building which consisted of the demolition of parts of its interior as well as the construction of an additional floor and a new wing. In addition, new buildings were to be constructed on nearby sites: an administrative building was to be built between the British and Knights' Buildings, and a building which housed student accommodation and a multistorey car park was to be built on the site of a nearby public car park.

This proposal was opposed by local residents, the Nationalist Party, the Democratic Party, the Catholic Church and various NGOs. A group of residents from the Cottonera area formed the civil action group Azzjoni: Tuna Artna Lura (Maltese for Action: Give Us Back Our Land) which held protests and petitioned against the proposal. Opposition to the project was mainly because public open spaces would have been built up, and the proposed extensions would have obstructed views of the Senglea fortifications from Cospicua. The NGO Flimkien għal Ambjent Aħjar was also opposed to the internal demolition of the Knights' Building, and it stated that the project would have a negative impact on the quality of life of Cottonera residents. There were also concerns relating to the project's potential impact on traffic and parking spaces, and that the project was unnecessary given the small number of students enrolled at the AUM, with some residents being concerned that the proposed student accommodation would be converted into a hotel. Other critics of the extension included Yana Mintoff and Labour Party MP Glenn Bedingfield; the latter was opposed to the accommodation which would have a swimming pool on the roof.

On 26 September 2019, the Planning Authority board announced that it will reject the proposed extension to the university, citing the need to preserve cultural heritage, maintain public open space and ensure the continued view of the fortifications. The formal refusal of planning permission was made on 21 November 2019. Sadeen Group decided to appeal this decision, and the case is still ongoing as of 2020.

Proposed campus at Żonqor Point

When the university project was announced in May 2015, the government offered Sadeen Group  of Outside Development Zone (ODZ) land near Żonqor Point in Marsaskala on which to build the university. A natural park, partially funded by the university, would be set up nearby. An early proposal also included the incorporation of the 19th-century Fort Leonardo into the university campus. Prime Minister Joseph Muscat stated that constructing the university in Marsaskala would pressure the owners of the former Jerma Palace Hotel to redevelop the site, which has fallen into disrepair since being closed down in 2007.

The proposal to use ODZ land raised concerns among environmentalists, and multiple NGOs, the Alternattiva Demokratika (AD) political party, the Malta Developers Association, and the Church spoke out against the proposal. Residents of Marsaskala and southern Malta supported the university project by signing a petition in its favour. Muscat responded to the criticism by stating that the Malta Environment and Planning Authority would consider other sites in the southern part of the island, and a public consultation process was subsequently made in order to select an alternative site for the university campus.

Opponents of the Żonqor Point development set up the Front Ħarsien ODZ (Maltese for Front for the Protection of ODZ) on 23 May 2015, and its founding members included then-Labour MPs Marlene and Godfrey Farrugia and former AD politician Michael Briguglio. The group held a protest in Valletta against the development on 20 June, and it was attended by 3000 people. On 20 August, it was announced that the government and Sadeen Group had reached an agreement to split the university between Cospicua and a reduced site at Żonqor Point. A new water polo pitch would also be built to replace the one demolished to make way for the university. Front Ħarsien ODZ and the University Students' Council spoke out against this proposal because it would still involve construction on ODZ land, although the former stated that it was better than the original proposal. The move was welcomed by the Cospicua Heritage Society, who said that the Three Cities and Kalkara would benefit from the project. In December 2015, Front Ħarsien ODZ criticized the government's granting of land to the university.

Sadeen Education Investment Ltd submitted a planning application to demolish the water polo pitch and construct the campus on 17 February 2017. The designs of the proposed campus are by the architect Ray Demicoli. In November 2017, after the university had started operating but had attracted significantly less students than expected, Education Minister Evarist Bartolo and Prime Minister Muscat stated that construction of the Żonqor campus would only begin once the Cospicua campus is ready and when it nears full capacity. Bartolo confirmed this once again in January 2018, and in the following month AUM President Lewis Walker stated that development at Żonqor would only begin when the university has at least 2,000 students at its Cospicua campus.

Organization and administration

The American University of Malta has a Board of Trustees which is headed by Prince Jean of Luxembourg as Chairman and Hani Salah as Vice-Chairman as of 2022–23. The university's administration also includes President Michel Najjar and Provost Nabil Fares. 

As of 2023, the university has 20 faculty members.

Academic profile

AUM holds a university license from the NCFHE (License Number: 2016-002). This license states that AUM is fully authorized to deliver academic degree programs at levels 6 (Bachelors), 7 (Masters), and 8 (Doctorate), according to the Malta Qualifications Framework and the European Qualification for Framework for Lifelong Learning.

AUM offers 10 undergraduate and 3 graduate degrees in the areas of Business, Engineering, Technology and Arts. The American standard for a liberal arts education combines a general and a specialized type of education. The general one focuses on a broad approach to education, while the specialized one is simply the major that takes an in-depth approach.

Students in all undergraduate academic programs at AUM must complete the General Education Program. Students are required to take a set of courses outside their major to develop their understanding of broad disciplinary areas and the connections between and among them. The General Education requirements are a total of 41-42 US/82- 84 ETCS credits.

Admissions

The American University of Malta is open to receiving both domestic Maltese students and international students from all over the world. All applicants can apply for their degree of choice online by submitting all the necessary documents. All programs at the AUM are taught in English. Candidates must provide proof of English proficiency in order to receive full admission to the University.

Candidates without the proper documentation or low proficiency may begin their studies through the English for Academic Purposes pathway program. The EAP program at the American University of Malta is designed to help students who meet all the requirements for admissions except for the language proficiency and need to improve their English language skills in order to begin their degree program. This program will help students improve their skills in Listening, Speaking, Reading and Writing to help them succeed once they start their degree.

Student life

Housing
The American University of Malta currently offers accommodation in apartments in Kalkara, a town located close to the campus in Cospicua. The apartments are co-ed, such that males and females can live in the same apartment but they cannot share a bedroom unless they are a married couple.

Sadeen Education Investment Ltd purchased Bowyer House, a hostel in Tarxien, to be used as the university's official student accommodation in September 2017, and this property is currently being renovated.

Sports
The American University of Malta Cricket Club (AUM CC), also called the AUM Knights, is the university's cricket club, and it is approved by the Malta Cricket Association.

The university also has an esports team which is also known as the AUM Knights, and it offers esports scholarships.

Criticism

Not American

One criticism is that the AUM is not authentically American. The company behind the project is from Jordan, not the United States. Journalist Daphne Caruana Galizia noted that "the man the Jordanian outfit has chosen to be rector of this questionable 'university' is John Ryder, who is the only American aspect of the project." In 2018, the AUM hired an American president, Lewis N. Walker, as well.

Philip Altbach, Boston College faculty member and director of the Center for International Higher Education, expressed concern that institutions such as Sadeen-owned AUM are "business interests starting universities to make money using the American brand."

When asked in an interview about her views concerning the controversial American university in Malta, outgoing U.S. Ambassador to Malta G. Kathleen Hill insisted "It's not American...it's not an American initiative but an initiative by the Sadeen Group which is out of Jordan."

To this criticism, the AUM's provost John Ryder responded that the university is "not a brand or offshoot, or run by any American university ... [but it is] American in curriculum and organisation." The curricula are officially provided by DePaul University, Chicago. A spokesperson for DePaul University issued a statement, qualifying the legitimacy of AUM's curricula: "Faculty designed degree programs in areas that were requested, with the dual goals of being academically well-designed and meeting regulatory requirements in Malta. Individual faculty members were selected with the help of teams -- composed of associate deans, school directors and department chairs -- in the relevant colleges. Faculty then were asked to design the curriculum, and they were compensated for their work," also adding; "[t]he right to use our name (DePaul University) is specifically in connection to the curriculum. While specifics of any DePaul contract are proprietary, I can tell you that it went through the usual, internal multi-step review process."

Lack of transparency and violation of public trust

Criticism has also been levelled at the AUM and Maltese Labour government for keeping the contents of its agreements secret from the Maltese public. Maltese Prime Minister Joseph Muscat was accused of a lack of transparency with regard to how government agreements with Sadeen were made.  He responded by saying that the public was informed on the first occasion. NGOs have called for the publication of the agreement between the government and Sadeen Group. 

Former AUM employees have criticized the AUM for its lack of transparency. A former staff member has called the AUM's social media and marketing campaigns "smoke and mirrors," meant to hide the "AUM's activities...from the public eye, behind a Facebook page designed to make you believe you've entered an idyllic higher education wonderland, in which it's nearly impossible to distinguish between fiction and fact, fantasy and reality, glitz and horror." A former lecturer at the AUM cited a confidentiality clause in the institution's standard employment contract that restricts transparency by threatening punitive measures against employees who leak information to the media. The lecturer reports: "There was a confidentiality clause which stated that we would have to pay back twice our yearly salary, if we broke it—a provision that is quite bizarre in America, and unheard of in Malta."

In May 2019, the AUM's plans to develop protected land in Żonqor, which were previously a  matter of public record, disappeared from the Planning Authority website. This event coincided with the Planning Authority's adoption of a new policy to only disclose documents which are part of completed development applications. So long as the AUM maintains an incomplete application, it can effectively hide from public view the planning documents for the controversial second campus at Żonqor Point. The Planning Authority's policy has since come under scrutiny by the Ombudsman.

Locating university in higher education saturated Malta
The Maltese government has also been criticized for permitting AUM, a foreign university, to establish itself in the small country of Malta, which is already home to several higher education institutions. The government stated that the AUM would end the monopoly that the University of Malta has on higher education. In response to this, lecturers at the University of Malta disagreed with the use of the term "monopoly", stating that the university already competes with other institutions such as MCAST. The Maltese Ministry of Education has supported other foreign higher education start-ups in Malta, for instance, Global College and Woolf University.

Faculty recruitment for accreditation purposes only
Maltese blogger and political commentator Manuel Delia and a dismissed AUM lecturer criticised the Maltese accreditor and the AUM, alleging that the initial recruitment of faculty, including several highly qualified academics from the United States and Britain, "was a scam to demonstrate academic prowess to the National Council for Further and Higher Education in order to acquire accreditation." In the aftermath of the mass firing event in January 2018, new faculty demonstrated reduced qualifications, received significantly lower salaries and, in at least four cases, were guilty of ethical improprieties of which their predecessors were not.

Inadequate quality assurance
The AUM has also been criticised for its poor quality assurance practices. Currently the AUM is accredited by the Maltese National Commission for Further and Higher Education, but has not been able to meet the more rigorous standards of U.S. accreditation.

In at least two instances, Provost John Ryder and Quality Assurance Manager Rania Allam failed to meet minimum quality assurance standards for recruitment and hiring. Soon after the mass firing of faculty in January 2018, the AUM recruited, hired and employed a lecturer with a history of committing plagiarism, clearly having violated the principle of academic integrity. Due to inadequate quality assurance, Ryder and Allam allowed a second faculty member, fraudulently claiming to hold academic credentials he did not, to join the AUM faculty.

Investigative journalist Lizzie Eldridge has noted how the AUM's mass dismissal of faculty combined with poor quality assurance in hiring replacement faculty normalises unethical practices for new enterprises in Malta: "It becomes normal for a 'start-up' university to engage in mass firings of their newly employed and highly qualified staff and then hire both a plagiarist and a fraud."

In August 2019, two former employees of the Maltese National Commission for Further and Higher Education, both directly involved in the AUM's accreditation process, were hired by the university as lecturers, suggesting the possibility of a revolving door or quid pro quo arrangement between the accreditor and the AUM.

Controversies

In the first three years of the AUM's existence, the higher education institution has been plagued by a number of controversies.  Despite the university's small student body, high employee turnover and growing legal troubles, Malta's Education Minister Evarist Bartolo insisted that the AUM is not entirely a  "garage operation."

Suspicions of quid pro quo
The Maltese press raised concerns that the National Commission for Further and Higher Education (NCFHE) turned a blind eye to the mass dismissal of faculty in January 2018 in a quid pro quo arrangement with the AUM. Two former employees of the NCFHE, both directly involved in the AUM's accreditation, were hired as lecturers by the university in August 2019, less than two years after the dismissal of the university's entire faculty: "Manuel Vella Rago was until recently Head of Quality Assurance at NCFHE, while Audrey Abela was its Head of Accreditation, both key roles in the regulation of the AUM." According to investigative journalist Lizzie Eldridge, "Manuel Vella Rago's previous position [was not only] as Head of Quality Assurance at the NCFHE,  . . . he was [also] one of the inspectors who made that 'surprise visit' to the AUM last year [soon after the mass firing of the AUM's faculty in January 2018]."

Low student enrolments and inability to achieve targets
In the AUM's first two years, refusals by then-Provost John Ryder to publicly release the official enrollment figures was a recurring flashpoint of controversy. An early promotional video presented the new university's plan to admit 1,000 students in its first year, eventually reaching a total enrollment of 4,000 students by its fourth year.

The AUM officially began offering classes on Tuesday September 12, 2017, rather than Monday September 11, to avoid association with the September 11 attacks anniversary. Asked how many students the AUM admitted for the Fall semester (academic year 2017-18), then-Provost Ryder would only say that student recruitment was “proving to be challenging." In November of the same year, the Times of Malta reported that the AUM's revised plan was to enroll 330 students in its first semester, but the "university managed to attract 15 students." The figure was denied by university officials. Four days later, Ryder acknowledged in a Television Malta interview that the AUM student body numbered 23.

At the start of the subsequent academic year (2018–19), the AUM's provost and the director of student recruitment only disclosed the number of countries from which it received applications, but not the total numbers of applicants or enrolments. Despite then-Provost Ryder's promises to eventually share enrolment figures with the media, none were ever officially released. An anonymous source at the university divulged to the Times of Malta that six new students had been admitted in the fledgling institution's second year of operations.

In his role as Chairman of the Cottonera Rehabilitation Committee, Maltese Parliament Member and Labour Party insider Glenn Bedingfield expressed scepticism that the AUM would fulfil its contractual obligation with the Government of Malta to reach the agreed-upon number of students four years after the building phase of the Cospicua campus is completed: "I am beginning to doubt whether they [the AUM] will ever be able to attract the 4,000 students in the promised timeframe [2025 to 2029]." On the 13 October 2019, the Times of Malta reported that the AUM had only recruited one-fifth of the targeted number of students, 143 of the 710 it had promised the Maltese government.

Mass dismissals and other personnel decisions
AUM personnel decisions have also generated controversy, raising concerns about the legality of the new institution's employment policies and practices. Within a period of seven months, the employment contracts of 10 university employees were terminated, either by dismissal or resignation: (1) Deputy (Construction Project) Manager (dismissal), (2) Admissions Director (dismissal), (3) Marketing and Public Relations Director (dismissal), (4) Vice President for Administrative Affairs (dismissal), (5) IT Technician (dismissal), (6) Webmaster (resignation), (7) Admissions Counselor (resignation), (8) Human Resources Director (dismissal), (9) Professor of Finance (dismissal) and (10) Dean of Student Affairs (resignation).

Several of these terminations precipitated legal action by ex-employees against the university. The dismissed deputy manager filed a judicial protest against Sadeen Education. The former admissions director sued the university for unfair dismissal. In a judicial protest, the former Assistant Director of Admissions alleged that the AUM fraudulently misrepresented salaries to prospective hires (wage agreed to in Euros but remunerated in U.S. Dollars), mismanaged the student recruitment process and, upon completion of the employees' service, failed to pay final salaries in full, "presumably from loss of currency exchange."

On 4 January 2018, Provost John Ryder informed the 12 remaining AUM faculty members by e-mail that their employment with the university had been terminated without cause. Five of the terminated faculty members sued the AUM for unfair dismissal and abuse of the six-month probationary period rule. According to Maltese Labour law, the six-month probationary rule stipulates that "[t]he first six months of any employment under a contract of service is deemed to be probationary employment, unless otherwise agreed by both parties for a shorter probation period. [...] During the probationary period, either party may terminate the employment at will without reason. Provided that a week's notice of the termination of employment has to be given to the other party in the case of an employee who has been in the employment of the same employer continuously for more than one month." The five lecturers reached an agreement with Sadeen to settle the case before it reached adjudication, the terms of which were never made public. Arkansas State University, which signed an agreement with the AUM in March 2019 to offer dual degree programs, decided in September 2019 to freeze and scrutinize the AUM agreement after discovery of the mass firing of faculty in January 2018.

In a two hour interview with investigative journalist Lizzie Eldridge, soon-to-be-retired Provost John Ryder admitted that the mistake that led to the mass dismissal of faculty from the AUM in January 2018 was his own, an error in forecasting the number of students, courses and instructors required for the first academic year: "Part of the problem was that we were way overstaffed because I had hired with certain assumptions about the number of students and we weren't even in the neighbourhood for the first intake of students . . . It turned out to be much more difficult than we thought. We were way over-optimistic about recruiting and hiring."

Legal and ethical wrongdoing by Board of Trustees members

Another source of controversy is the alleged legal and ethical wrongdoing by members of the AUM's board of trustees. The board members are (1) Prince Jean of Luxembourg (chair), (2) John Ryder, (3) Taddeo Scerri (chairman of the board at the Bank of Valletta), (4) Hani Salah (Chief Executive Officer of Sadeen Group), (5) Taher al-Masri, (6) Derrick Gosselin and (7) Carine Boonen.

Board member Taddeo Scerri was accused of ignoring conflicts of interest between his AUM board appointment and his current and past professional positions in Malta's financial sector.

Board member John Ryder, who was appointed immediately after his resignation as provost, undertook the mass firing of faculty in January 2018 as well as hiring replacement faculty with histories of plagiarism and fraud in the aftermath.

On 23 January 2020, Adrian Hillman, former Allied Group managing director, was removed from his role as the government's representative to the AUM board. A spokesperson for the Maltese Ministry of Education stated, "Mr Adrian Hillman will no longer be the Government nominee on AUM." Three years prior, Hillman was appointed to the board of trustees while under criminal investigation for laundering money and receiving kickbacks from the Maltese Prime Minister's chief of staff Keith Schembri, who has been implicated in the Panama Papers money laundering scheme and the assassination of investigative journalist Daphne Caruana Galizia.

Students abscond to Europe
In February 2018, it was revealed that four AUM students never attended any lectures and they were believed to have used their student visas to travel from Malta to other countries in the Schengen Area. In an interview with investigative journalist Lizzie Eldridge, Provost John Ryder admitted that foreign students had used the AUM as a launch board into Europe. Responding defensively, he acknowledged that the absconding students posed security risks (human trafficking and terrorism), but insisted that all were reported to Maltese immigration authorities.

References

External links
 Official website
 

2016 establishments in Malta
Cospicua
Educational institutions established in 2016
Liberal arts colleges
Universities in Malta